Koska is a village in Peleliu, Palau. It is located near Imelchol Village and Kloulklubed.

See also
List of cities, towns and villages in Palau

References

Sources

Peleliu
Populated places in Palau